Adath Shalom Synagogue is a Masorti Jewish Synagogue located on 8 Rue Georges-Bernard-Shaw in Paris' 15th arrondissement.

History 
The congregation was established in 1989. It adopted the name Adath Shalom, which means "Assembly of Peace" in Hebrew. In 1991, Rivon Krygier became the synagogue's Rabbi.

The community identifies with the Masorti movement, or Conservative Judaism, which attempts to bridge modernity (like Reform Judaism) and a respect for tradition (like Orthodox Judaism). There is and equal role for men and women, and the community is invested in Interfaith dialogue with the group Vivre Ensemble in Paris' 15th arrondissement.

In 2004, the synagogue founded a satellite location, originally named  Adath Shalom East. This location was renamed Dor V'Dor (Generation to Generation in Hebrew) in 2013. This location is at 10 rue du Cambodge in the 20th arrondissement. Their Rabbi is Yeshaya Dalsace.

In 2008, Adath Shalom had 300 families as members. It is the largest Masorti community in France.

References

External links 

15th arrondissement of Paris
Conservative Judaism in Europe
Conservative synagogues
Organizations established in 1989
Synagogues in Paris
1989 establishments in France